Vance Linwood Page (September 15, 1905 – July 14, 1951), was a professional baseball player who played pitcher in the Major Leagues from 1938 to 1941. He played for the Chicago Cubs.

Born in Elm City, North Carolina, Page died from injuries he received when he fell off the roof of a barn in Wilson, North Carolina.

Professional career

Major League Debut 
Before making his debut, the Washington Senators traded Page to the Chicago Cubs on July 30, 1938, for Bob Logan, and cash.

On August 6, 1938, Vance Page made his MLB debut with the Chicago Cubs, playing the Boston Bees. Over 8 innings pitched, he gave up 11 hits, and 1 run, earning the loss.

World Series 
Vance Page was part on the Cubs' World Series roster in 1938. During Game 4 on October 9, 1938, Page came in as a reliever, going 1.1 innings, and giving up 2 runs. It was his first and only World Series appearance.

References

External links

1905 births
1951 deaths
Major League Baseball pitchers
Baseball players from North Carolina
Chicago Cubs players
Accidental deaths from falls
Accidental deaths in North Carolina
People from Elm City, North Carolina